Chashchilova is a rural locality (a village) in Yorgvinskoye Rural Settlement, Kudymkarsky District, Perm Krai, Russia. The population was 113 as of 2010. There are 14 streets.

Geography 
Chashchilova is located 10 km northeast of Kudymkar (the district's administrative centre) by road. Porskokova is the nearest rural locality.

References 

Rural localities in Kudymkarsky District